The 1971 Championship of Australia was the 15th edition of the Championship of Australia, an ANFC-organised national club Australian rules football match between the champion clubs from the VFL and the SANFL.

This was the last Championship of Australia title to be held as a single game before the competition was expanded the following year into a knockout tournament that included the champions of the WANFL and the Tasmanian State Premiership.

Qualified Teams

Venue
 Adelaide Oval (Capacity: 64,000)

Match Details

Championship of Australia 

Championship of Australia
Championship of Australia
October 1971 sports events in Australia